Our Lady of Good Counsel Church, or variations with Parish or otherwise, may refer to:

in India
 Church of Our Lady of Good Counsel & Shrine of St. Anthony, Sion, in Mumbai

in Norway
 Our Lady of Good Counsel Church, Porsgrunn

in Slovenia
 Our Lady of Good Counsel Church, Globočice pri Kostanjevici

in the United States
 Our Lady of Good Counsel Church (Bridgeport, Connecticut)
 Our Lady of Good Counsel Catholic Church (Pearl City, Hawaii)
 The church associated with Our Lady of Good Counsel High School (Montgomery County, Maryland)
 Our Lady of Good Counsel Church (Manhattan)
 Our Lady of Good Counsel's Church (Staten Island, New York)
 Our Lady of Good Counsel Church (Moorestown, New Jersey)

See also 
 Good Counsel Complex, White Plains, New York, NRHP-listed
 Saint Mary of Good Counsel Catholic Church (Adrian, Michigan), Adrian, Michigan, NRHP-listed